The following is a list of Koreans who are Korean by ethnicity and Buddhist by religion.

Celebrities 

 Chae Rim
 Eun Jiwon
 Han Seungwoo (Victon)
 Hong Jin-young
 Jang Woo-hyuk
 Jang Yun-jeong
 Jihoon (Treasure)
 Kan Mi-youn
 Kim Jong-kook
 Kim Min-jong
 Lee Soo-geun
 Lee Young-ah
 Lee Young-eun
 Leo (VIXX)
 MC Sniper
 Moon Geun-young
 Moon Hee-joon
 Outsider (rapper)
 Park Hyung-sik (ZE:A)
 Park Gyu-ri
 Park Ji-yeon (T-ara)
 Shin Jung-hwan
 Sohee (Wonder Girls)
 Song Ji-hyo
 Soo Ae
Solar (Mamamoo)
 Seulgi (Red Velvet)
 Suho (EXO)
 Sung Si-kyung
 Uhm Tae-woong
 Jang Wooyoung (2PM)
 Jeon Soyeon 
 Yoo Jae-suk
 Yuk Young-soo

Ancient people

Philosophers and monks 

 Doseon
 Gihwa
 Hyecho
 Hyujeong
 Ichadon
 Jinpyo
 Jinul
 Muhak
 Seungnang
 Taego Bou
 Uicheon
 Uisang
 Woncheuk
 Wonhyo
 Yujeong

Monarchs 

 King Sejong the Great
 Taejo of Goryeo
 Taejo of Joseon
 Queen Seondeok of Silla

References

Korean
Buddhists